The 1985 Australian Rally Championship was a series of six rallying events held across Australia. It was the 18th season in the history of the competition.

Barry Lowe and navigator Kevin Pedder in the Subaru RX Turbo won the 1985 Championship.

Season review

The 18th Australian Rally Championship was held over six events across Australia, the season consisting of one event each for New South Wales, Victoria, Queensland, South Australia, Tasmania and West Australia.  This was the first time an ARC round was conducted in Tasmania, making it a truly Australian wide series. The 1985 season saw the Group A cars finally come into their own, with many crews making the change to the new category, but more importantly the first championship won by a Group A car.  It was a tightly fought season with only three points separating first and second after the six events.

The Rallies

The six events of the 1985 season were as follows.

Round One – The Advocate – Fairfield Stages Rally

Round Two – Western Mail – Nissan Rally

Round Three – Mobil Dealers Rally of the Valley

Round Four – The Keema Classic Rally

Round Five – The Tile Supplies Rally

Round Six – Akademos Rally

1985 Drivers and Navigators championships
Final pointscore for 1985 is as follows.

Barry Lowe – Champion Driver 1985

Kevin Pedder – Champion Navigator 1985

References

External links
  Results of Snowy Mountains Rally and ARC results.

Rally Championship
Rally competitions in Australia
1985 in rallying